Uglovoye is a rural locality (a selo) and the administrative center of Uglovskiy Selsoviet of Mazanovsky District, Amur Oblast, Russia. The population was 530 as of 2018. There are 24 streets.

Geography 
Bogoslovka is the nearest rural locality.

References 

Rural localities in Mazanovsky District